Ralph George Houk (August 9, 1919 – July 21, 2010), nicknamed The Major, was an American catcher, coach, manager, and front office executive in Major League Baseball. He is best known as the successor of Casey Stengel as manager of the New York Yankees from 1961 to 1963, when his teams won three consecutive American League pennants and the 1961 and 1962 World Series championships. In  he became the second rookie manager to win 100 games in a season and third rookie manager to win a World Series. He was the first manager to win World Series titles in his first two seasons and the first manager since Hughie Jennings to win three pennants in his first three seasons.

Playing career
A native of Lawrence, Kansas (Stull Community), Houk was a catcher working his way through the Yankees' farm system when the U.S. entered World War II. He enlisted in the armed forces, serving with Company I, 89th Cavalry Reconnaissance Squadron (Mechanized) of the 9th Armored Division in July 1944. He rose to the rank of Major (the source of his Yankees nickname). He was a combat veteran of Bastogne and the Battle of the Bulge, and was awarded the Silver Star with an Oak Leaf Cluster, the Bronze Star with an Oak Leaf Cluster and Purple Heart.

Returning to baseball after the war, Houk eventually reached the major leagues, serving as the Yankees' second- and third-string catcher behind Yogi Berra.

Coaching career
During his last five years as a major-league player (1950–1954), Houk played in only 31 regular-season games, made 30 total plate appearances, and caught 83 innings.  By 1953 he had transitioned to becoming the Yankees' full-time bullpen coach, effectively beginning his managerial apprenticeship.

In 1955 he was named manager of the Yanks' Triple-A affiliate, the Denver Bears of the American Association. Following three highly successful seasons at Denver, culminating with the 1957 league playoff and Junior World Series championships, Houk returned to the Bronx as Stengel's first-base coach from 1958 to 1960. From late May through early June , Houk served as acting manager of the Yanks for 13 games while Stengel, 70, was sidelined by illness. (The team won 7 and lost 6.) Then, after the Yanks lost the 1960 World Series to the Pittsburgh Pirates—and with Houk one of the hottest managerial candidates in baseball—the Yankees "discharged" Stengel (to use Stengel's own words) and promoted Houk.

A player's manager
Houk was known as a "player's manager"—albeit one with a quick temper. Future Los Angeles Dodgers manager Tommy Lasorda briefly played for Houk at Denver and called Houk the best handler of men he ever played for, and modeled his managerial style on him. The Kansas Sports Hall of Fame, of which Houk is a member, describes Houk as "rough, blunt and decisive" and his tantrums in arguments with umpires earned him 45 ejections as a manager in the majors. Houk is tied with Billy Martin for fourteenth place on baseball's "most ejected" list.

The early 1960s Yankees responded to Houk's leadership; the 1961 team led by Roger Maris (61 home runs), Mickey Mantle (54 homers) and Whitey Ford (25 victories) won 109 games and beat the Cincinnati Reds in five games in the World Series. His  club won 96 games, and were victorious over the San Francisco Giants in seven games in the Fall Classic. In , the Yanks won 104 games and rolled to the pennant, but were swept in four games by the Dodgers in the Series.

In the Yankees front office
Houk moved into the Yankees' front office as general manager on October 23, 1963, replacing Roy Hamey, and Berra, at the end of his playing career, became the Yanks' new manager. Yogi would win the  pennant after a summer-long struggle with the Baltimore Orioles and Chicago White Sox, but Houk and the Yankee ownership quickly became disenchanted with Berra's work and in late August they made up their mind to fire him regardless of how the season turned out.  After the Yankees' seven-game loss to the St. Louis Cardinals in the 1964 World Series, Houk sacked Berra. Later, Houk said that the Yankee brain trust had concluded Berra wasn't ready to be a manager, though he didn't elaborate on the reasoning.

To succeed Berra, he then hired Johnny Keane, who had just resigned as manager of the champion Cardinals. Houk had admired Keane as a competitor in the American Association from almost a decade before and, according to author David Halberstam, the Yankees had made overtures to Keane during the 1964 regular season about becoming their manager for 1965. But the great postwar Yankee dynasty was aged and crumbling, the farm system had seriously deteriorated, and the Kansas City Athletics were no longer a reliable source for Major League talent. Keane, a longtime minor league manager, was better suited by temperament for managing young players than established and aging superstars, and his hiring was a failure. The team fell to sixth in —their first losing record since 1925, and only their second since 1918.

Back to the bench

Second term with Yankees
Houk (eventually succeeded as general manager by Lee MacPhail) thus began a second, and far less successful, term as Yankee manager, finishing the 1966 season. Their talent and farm system both depleted, the Yankees finished in last place for the first time since . A long rebuilding process followed, including Bobby Richardson's retirement (Richardson's roommate, Tony Kubek, had retired because a bad back after the 1965 season) and the trading away of Maris, Clete Boyer and, during the 1967 season, Elston Howard. Houk would continue to manage the Yankees from 1967 until 1973.

Despite two years left on a three‐year contract, Houk announced his resignation immediately after a season-ending 8–5 loss to the Detroit Tigers on September 30, 1973 in the final game at Yankee Stadium prior to its closure for a two-year renovation. While first-year team owner George Steinbrenner's commanding style has led some to think the new owner influenced Houk's departure, he told Bill Madden of the New York Daily News it was the constant booing of Yankee fans that pushed him. Houk even said that Steinbrenner insisted he'd get some new players to restore the team's greatness. "And he did, bringing in Catfish and Reggie, " Houk told Madden in the sportswriter's book Pride of October. "That'll make you good in a hurry!"  Apart from a brief stint with the  Tigers' Class B affiliate in Augusta, Georgia, he had spent the first 35 years of his adult life on the Yankees' payroll.

Detroit Tigers
Houk signed a three-year, $225,000 contract to join the Tigers in a similar capacity just less than two weeks later, on October 11. He succeeded former Yankees teammate Billy Martin, who had been dismissed on September 2 and Joe Schultz, who served in the interim for the remainder of the 1973 season. 

Aware of the challenge he was going to face, he stated, "I'm more concerned with winning than rebuilding, but we have to rebuild, there's no doubt about it." The veteran club (its 1973 roster averaged 31.8 years of age) had won the AL East in 1972 under Martin, but was in need of replacing its longtime stars, including Hall of Famer Al Kaline, with younger talent. 

By , Houk had restored Detroit to respectability and its first winning record since 1973, bringing to the team future stars of the Sparky Anderson Tigers such as Lou Whitaker, Alan Trammell and Jack Morris. After an 86–76 season in 1978, and with the roster's average age a youthful 26.3, Houk retired.

Boston Red Sox
Houk's name had been linked by the media with the Boston Red Sox' managerial job since his days as a Yankees' coach. In late October, when the Red Sox called about their opening (they had fired Don Zimmer), he jumped at the chance.

Although not as daunting as his Detroit assignment, Houk faced another rebuilding job: the powerful Boston team of the 1970s was about to lose marquee players such as Carlton Fisk and Fred Lynn and needed to retool its roster. But Houk rose to the challenge, and in four seasons produced three over-.500 teams. On his watch, Boston broke in young players Wade Boggs, Roger Clemens, Bruce Hurst and Marty Barrett. When Houk retired from managing permanently in October , just after his 65th birthday, he bequeathed the core of another pennant winning ballclub (in this case, the 1986 Red Sox) to his successor, John McNamara.

His final record, over 20 years with the Yankees (1961–1963, 1966–1973), Tigers (1974–1978) and Red Sox (1981–1984) was 1,619 wins and 1,531 losses (.514), plus eight wins and eight losses in the World Series. In twenty seasons as manager, he had eleven winning seasons, with six finishes of third or better and five seasons with a finish of sixth or worse. After his first three championship seasons, he never appeared in the postseason.

Late career
Houk served with the Minnesota Twins as a special assistant to general manager Andy MacPhail, Lee's son, from 1987–1989 before retiring from the game for good. He thus enjoyed one additional world championship season, when the Twins defeated the Cardinals in the 1987 World Series.

Colorful opinions about Houk can be found in Jim Bouton's classic 1970 memoir, Ball Four. Houk was Bouton's first big league manager and sparred with him over contracts when Houk was the Yankees' GM.

Houk was portrayed by Bruce McGill in the 2001 film 61*.

He died on July 21, 2010 in Winter Haven, Florida, just nineteen days before he would have turned 91.  At age 90 he was, at the time, the oldest living manager of a World Series-winning, pennant-winning or post-season team.  He was survived by a daughter, Donna; a son, Robert; four grandchildren and 10 great-grandchildren.

On July 22, 2010, the Yankees announced players and coaches would wear a black armband in Houk's memory on the left sleeve of their home and away uniforms for the remainder of the 2010 season.

Managerial record

See also

 List of Major League Baseball managers by wins

References

External links

1919 births
2010 deaths
Augusta Tigers players
Baseball coaches from Kansas
Baseball players from Kansas
Beaumont Exporters players
Binghamton Triplets players
Boston Red Sox managers
Denver Bears players
Detroit Tigers managers
Joplin Miners players
Kansas City Blues (baseball) players
Major League Baseball bullpen coaches
Major League Baseball catchers
Major League Baseball first base coaches
Major League Baseball general managers
Minnesota Twins executives
Minor league baseball managers
Neosho Yankees players
New York Yankees coaches
New York Yankees executives
New York Yankees managers
New York Yankees players
People from Winter Haven, Florida
Recipients of the Silver Star
Sportspeople from Lawrence, Kansas
United States Army officers
United States Army personnel of World War II
Winter Haven, Florida
Hou